The 1948 Ohio gubernatorial election was held on November 2, 1948. Democratic nominee Frank Lausche defeated incumbent Republican Thomas J. Herbert in a rematch of the 1946 election with 53.67% of the vote.

Primary elections
Primary elections were held on May 4, 1948.

Democratic primary

Candidates
Frank Lausche, former Governor
Ray T. Miller, former Mayor of Cleveland
Robert S. Cox
Joseph Torok Jr.

Results

Republican primary

Candidates
Thomas J. Herbert, incumbent Governor
William L. White
Albert Edward Payne

Results

General election

Candidates
Frank Lausche, Democratic
Thomas J. Herbert, Republican

Results

References

1948
Ohio
Gubernatorial